Swat Sports Complex is located in Swat, Khyber Pakhtunkhwa province in Pakistan. The Sports Complex was formally opened on 29, November 2010.

History & Development 
Swat Sports Complex started functioning on 29 November 2010. The sports complex was formally inaugurated by Brig Hamayun Aziz and was funded by Pakistan Army. The complex was initially open for civil servants but later the general public was also allowed membership by paying nominal fee.

Sporting Facilities 
Swat Sports Complex currently sporting facilities for the following sports.
 Squash
 Volleyball
 Table Tennis
 Gymnastic
 Bodybuilding
 Snooker

See also
 Qayyum Stadium
 Hayatabad Sports Complex
 Abdul Wali Khan Sports Complex
 Mardan Sports Complex Pakistan

References 

Stadiums in Pakistan
 
Sport in Khyber Pakhtunkhwa